Calvin Christian School is a coeducational, private Kindergarten to Year 12 Christian school located 12 kilometres south of Hobart, Tasmania in Kingston.

It is part of Christian Schools Tasmania, a network of four schools around Hobart. It is owned and managed by an association, whose members are parents and past parents of students. Although initiated and supported by members of the Christian Reformed Churches of Australia, the Church has no controlling influence, and the school community now includes many families from other Christian backgrounds.

Calvin Christian School was the first Christian parent-controlled school in Australia, founded in 1962 by members of the Dutch Reformed community living in and around Kingston. The founders of the school were a group of Christian parents who shared a desire to educate their children in a Christ-centred environment. The school campus was built without any government funding, with many of the construction workers being parents of future students, who volunteered their time and resources to bring the school into existence. Calvin Christian School is named after the Protestant reformer John Calvin.

The school's annual fundraiser, held in September, is the Oliebollen Festival, which is well attended by the local community.

Sister schools 
- Emmanuel Christian School (1979),
- Channel Christian School (1988), 
- Northern Christian School (1992),

Sport 
Calvin Christian School is a member of the Sports Association of Tasmanian Independent Schools (SATIS).

See also
 List of schools in Tasmania
 Education in Tasmania

References

Private schools in Tasmania
Private secondary schools in Hobart
Educational institutions established in 1962
Nondenominational Christian schools in Hobart
1962 establishments in Australia
High schools in Hobart
Private schools in Hobart
Kingston, Tasmania